An over rate is the average number of overs bowled per hour by the bowling team in cricket. When calculated by Test match officials, allowances are made for wickets taken (2 mins per wicket), drinks breaks (4 mins each), DRS reviews, treatment for injuries, and other reasons, which means the figure is higher than if calculated simply as the number of overs bowled divided by the number of hours of play.

In the highest levels of cricket, bowling sides are expected to achieve a minimum over rate. Bowling teams that have failed to achieve the minimum over rate have had points deducted, the players fined, or the captain suspended for future matches. It has been suggested that penalty runs could be imposed.

Minimum levels

In Test cricket, bowling sides are expected to bowl a minimum of 15 overs per hour.

In ODIs, bowling sides are expected to bowl the 50 overs in 3.5 hours, equivalent to a minimum over rate of 14.28 overs per hour. 

In T20Is, bowling sides are expected to bowl the 20 overs in 1 hour 25 minutes, equivalent to a minimum over rate of 14.11 overs per hour.

Notable over rate penalties

In the 2017 County Championship, Middlesex were relegated by 1 point after a deduction of 2 points for a slow over rate. The minimum over rate requirement was 16 overs per hour.

In the World Cup 1999, India were fined four overs due to a slow over rate. However, Zimbabwe clinched the victory by 3 runs as India were bowled out in 45 overs.

In the 2019–21 ICC World Test Championship, Australia were deducted 4 points for a slow over rate in the second Test against India on 29 December 2020. This ended up resulting in Australia not qualifying for the final, as it reduced their final percentage of points won from 70% (336/480) to 69.2% (332/480). This put them below New Zealand, who achieved 70%. Australia would have finished above New Zealand, in 2nd place, and thus qualified for the final, if the two countries had tied on 70%, due to Australia's superior Runs Per Wicket Ratio.

See also
Over (cricket)

References

Bowling (cricket)
Cricket terminology
Cricket records and statistics
Cricket laws and regulations